The 1979 South Carolina Gamecocks football team represented the University of South Carolina as an independent during the 1979 NCAA Division I-A football season. Led by fifth-year head coach Jim Carlen, the Gamecocks compiled a record of 8–4. South Carolina was invited to the Hall of Fame Classic, where they lost to Missouri, 24–14.

Schedule

Roster

References

South Carolina
South Carolina Gamecocks football seasons
South Carolina Gamecocks football